Niilo Frans Wälläri (6 July 1897 – 25 August 1967) was a Finnish socialist, syndicalist politician. Wälläri led the Finnish Seamen's Union from 1938 until his death.

In 1913 Wälläri left Finland to become seaman. In 1916, he settled in the United States and joined the Industrial Workers of the World. Because of his political activities, Wälläri was deported back to Finland in 1920. Wälläri became active in the underground Communist Party of Finland (SKP) and the public Socialist Workers' Party of Finland (SSTP). Wälläri was chairman of SSTP in 1922–1923 and he was jailed at the Tammisaari prison camp when the party was disbanded. In the late 1920s Wälläri became frustrated with communists. This eventually led to a split in 1929. Wälläri was one of the main organisers behind the short-lived Left Group of Finnish Workers.

Wälläri joined the Social Democratic Party of Finland in 1935. Social Democratic Association of Transport Workers was his stronghold. The Soviet Union radioed anti-Wälläri propaganda during the Second World War.

After the war Wälläri left SDP and joined the Finnish People's Democratic League and the Socialist Unity Party. As leader of the seamen's trade union, he constantly threatened to damage the government and economy with strikes in order to gain benefits for the seaman's trade union.

Sources
 Wälläri, Niilo in Biografiskt lexikon för Finland .

1897 births
1967 deaths
People from Lieto
People from Turku and Pori Province (Grand Duchy of Finland)
Communist Party of Finland politicians
Socialist Workers Party of Finland politicians
Left Group of Finnish Workers politicians
Social Democratic Party of Finland politicians
Socialist Unity Party (Finland) politicians
Syndicalists
Industrial Workers of the World members
Finnish trade union leaders